Club Deportivo Lugo is a Spanish football team based in Lugo, in the autonomous community of Galicia. Founded on 8 July 1953, it plays in Segunda División, holding home games at Estadio Anxo Carro.

History
The new board of directors was officially formed under the presidency of Emilio Núñez Torrón on Wednesday, 8 July 1953, after a merger between SG Lucense and CD Polvorín. CD Lugo played their first official match against Pontevedra CF on Sunday, 13 September 1953. Lugo won it 3:1. With the new configuration of the Tercera División from the 1956–57 season Lugo permanently played there for many further years. In the 1961-62 Lugo led by the coach Luis Diestro won their first trophy, becoming Tercera División champion.

Lugo earned promotion for the first time to Segunda División in 1992, but could not remain more than one season in the league. The 1992-93 season was unsuccessful for the club, as it had only 25 points in 38 games and finished in the 18th position among 20 teams. Lugo became a representative of the middle class of the Segunda División B. Between 1994 and 2000 the club had no problems retaining its place in the category.

It took 20 years before the club earned promotion again to the second division after beating Cádiz in the last round of the promotion play-offs, after a penalty shootout.

In 2013 the club started their second consecutive season in the Segunda. Lugo finished in 12th position with 54 points, just 4 points from being relegated to Segunda División B.

The 2014–15 season was the sixth and the last for coach Quique Setién. With 49 points Lugo reached 15th position and achieved their goal to retain its place in Segunda División. Luis Milla was chosen as a new coach for the 2015–16 season. Unfortunately, he left the club in February 2016. He explained that it was due to personal reasons and the club accepted his resignation.

In October 2017, after twelve rounds of the 2017–18 season, Lugo for the first time in their history led the table of the Segunda División. However, the team finished that season in the 12th position.

During the 2018-19 season Lugo was fighting to stay in the Segunda División, and finally ended up on the 18th position which allowed them to remain in the Spanish Second Division for a seventh consecutive season. The club went undefeated in the last 6 games of the season which helped them finish just 2 points above the relegation zone.

Kit
The current kit consists of a red and white vertical striped shirt, light blue shorts and light blue socks. The shirt has remained unchanged since 1955 except in 1996 when horizontal stripes were chosen instead of vertical. The second kit isn't set and has changed multiple times. However, the light blue similar to the Flag of Galicia is the one that has been used the longest.

For the 2013–14 Second Division season, the company originally commissioned to make the kit was the Italian company Kappa, but due to disagreements over the retail price, the agreement was cancelled, and a new agreement was reached with the company Enfíos.

Kit history

Season to season

12 seasons in Segunda División
23 seasons in Segunda División B
34 seasons in Tercera División
1 season in Categorías Regionales

Current squad

Reserve team

Out on loan

Current technical staff

Stadium
CD Lugo play its home matches at the Estadio Anxo Carro. It has a capacity of approximately 8,000. Built in 1974 it was inaugurated on 31 August 1974, with a triangular tournament featuring also Deportivo de La Coruña and Club Lemos.

 Google map of Anxo Carro

Famous players
Note: this list includes players that have appeared in at least 100 league games and/or have reached international status.

Coaches

References

External links
Official website 
Futbolme team profile 
BDFutbol team profile

 
Football clubs in Galicia (Spain)
Association football clubs established in 1953
Segunda División clubs
1953 establishments in Spain